Bare Trees is the sixth studio album by British-American rock band Fleetwood Mac, released in March 1972. It was their last album to feature Danny Kirwan, who was fired during the album's supporting tour. In the wake of the band's success in the mid-1970s, Bare Trees peaked at number 70 on US Billboard 200 chart. The album was certified platinum by the Recording Industry Association of America (RIAA) in 1988.

Mick Fleetwood was particularly impressed with Kirwan's contributions to the album. "Danny had the chops with layering techniques, and the ability to know what's right and wrong in the studio," he said.

Track notes
"Child of Mine" alludes to Kirwan's biological father not having been part of his life (Kirwan was his stepfather's surname). "The Ghost" was later re-recorded by Bob Welch for His Fleetwood Mac Years and Beyond, Vol. 2 in 2006, but this version was only available on the digital edition. "Homeward Bound" alludes to Christine McVie's dislike of flying and touring, also alluded to in her 1997 song "Temporary One". "Sunny Side of Heaven" was an instrumental, which was later performed with Lindsey Buckingham on guitar for some shows in the mid-1970s.

"Bare Trees" shares a theme with both the album's cover photography by John McVie and the closing poem "Thoughts On a Grey Day." "Sentimental Lady" was released as a single, and was later re-recorded by Welch (with Mick Fleetwood, Christine McVie, and Buckingham backing him) for his solo album French Kiss. Welch recorded the song again for His Fleetwood Mac Years & Beyond in 2003. "Danny's Chant" features the use of wah-wah guitars. The track is largely an instrumental, although it does feature Kirwan's rhythmic, non-verbal vocals.

"Spare Me a Little of Your Love" became a staple of the band's live act from 1972 to 1977. It was also covered by Johnny Rivers on his studio album New Lovers and Old Friends in 1975. Jackie DeShannon recorded a version for her 1972 album Jackie although this did not make the final cut and was not released until 2015. The lyrics for "Dust" were taken from the first two verses of a poem of the same title, written by Rupert Brooke in 1910. Unlike W H Davies, who received a credit for the words to "Dragonfly", Brooke was not credited.

The final track on the album, "Thoughts on a Grey Day", is not a Fleetwood Mac song, but a monaural recorded poem written and read by an elderly woman, Mrs. Scarrott, who lived near the band's communal home, 'Benifold', in southern England. Bob Welch, however, said in a Penguin Q&A in 1999, "The spoken thing Mick does about 'Trees so bare' was written, I think, by this sweet old lady that lived near Benifold ... Mick did an affectionate 'schtick' on her to close the album."

Five of the ten tracks were written by Kirwan. "Trinity", another Kirwan song recorded at the sessions, was subsequently released in 1992 on the 25 Years – The Chain box set in stereo. The 2020 reissue of "Bare Trees" features the track in an alternate mono mix, alongside the US single mix of "Sentimental Lady", and a live version of "Homeward Bound".

Commercial performance
Bare Trees debuted at number 175 on US Billboard 200 chart dated 22 April 1972. The album reached its peak at number 70 on the chart dated 3 June 1972, after being on the chart for seven weeks. The album ultimately spent a total of 27 weeks on the chart.

On 9 February 1988, the album was certified platinum by the Recording Industry Association of America (RIAA) for sales of over a million copies in the United States.

Track listing

Personnel
Fleetwood Mac
Danny Kirwan – guitar, vocals
Bob Welch – guitar, vocals
Christine McVie – keyboards, vocals
John McVie – bass guitar
Mick Fleetwood – drums, percussion

Additional personnel
"Special thanks to Mrs Scarrott for her readings, recorded at her home in Hampshire."

Production
Producer: Fleetwood Mac
Engineer: Martin Birch
Remix engineer: Bob Hughes
Remastering: Lee Herschberg
Cover photo by John McVie
Recorded at DeLane Lea Music Centre
Remixed at Record Plant Studios

Charts

Certifications

References

Fleetwood Mac albums
1972 albums
Reprise Records albums
Albums produced by Christine McVie
Albums produced by Bob Welch (musician)
Albums produced by Danny Kirwan
Albums produced by Martin Birch
Albums produced by Mick Fleetwood
Albums produced by John McVie